Asurakulam (English: Ferocious Clan) is an unreleased Indian Tamil action thriller film produced by Saravanan Ganesan and Vembaiyan Velayutham and directed by Vignesh Menon. The film features Shabarish and Vidya Pradeep in the leading roles, while Thambi Ramaiah, John Vijay, and Lal appear in supporting roles. C. Sathya composed the film's music.

The film's songs were released in 2015; however, the film itself is yet to release.

Cast
Shabarish 
Vidya Pradeep 
Thambi Ramaiah
John Vijay
Lal
Mime Gopi
Sharath Ravi
Pasanga Sivakumar

Production 
The film is directed by K. Vijayan's grandson Vignesh Menon. The film began production in mid-2015. Actress Vidya Pradeep did her stunts without a stunt double. Thambi Ramaiah called his role in this film "performance-oriented". The film was in post-production in October of 2015 and was scheduled to release on 27 November 2015.

Soundtrack
The Asurakulam soundtrack has seven songs composed by C. Sathya. Actor Thambi Ramaiah sang a song for the film. A viruttam from Kamba Ramayanam was included in the film's soundtrack but will not be in the film. The film's audio launch was held on 24 August 2015. Reviewing the soundtrack, a critic from Behindwoods rated the soundtrack three out of five  and wrote that "A spellbinding experience from C Sathya!" A critic from Only Kollywood wrote that "With lovely tunes that glisten diversely, Asurakulam is an album worth checking out". A critic from Milliblog wrote that "The soundtrack’s highlight is Mayako, a funky acid jazz’ish package led by Alphonse’s vocals". A writer from The Hindu included the song "Mayako" in the list of "Songs you must listen to this week" for the week of September 12.

References

External links
 

Unreleased Tamil-language films
Films scored by C. Sathya
Indian action thriller films